The Gyroflug SC 01 Speed Canard is an unconventional sports plane produced in Germany in the 1980s and 1990s. Inspired by the Rutan VariEze, the Speed Canard was an all-new design created without input from Rutan. Like the VariEze, the Speed Canard is a canard-configured mid-wing monoplane with wingtip fins that incorporate rudders. The two-seat tandem cockpit and canopy design were derived from Grob Twin Astir sailplane, and the nosewheel of the tricycle undercarriage is retractable. Construction throughout is of composite materials, and when the design attained German certification in 1983, it became the first composite canard design to achieve certification anywhere in the world. An interesting feature of the control system is that the twin rudders operate independently, allowing both rudders to be deflected outwards simultaneously, cancelling each other's yaw, but acting as airbrakes.

In 1987, the development of a four-seat version was announced as the E 401, but was abandoned soon thereafter.
In late 1988 Gyroflug partnered with Litton Industries using Gyroflug Speed Canard as for Litton's Advanced Tactical Surveillance System.

Specifications (SC 01 B-160)

References

 
 
 
 
 
 
 
 

1980s German sport aircraft
Canard aircraft
Speed Canard
Mid-wing aircraft
Single-engined pusher aircraft
Aircraft first flown in 1980